Hypolycaena nilgirica, the Nilgiri tit, is an uncommon species of lycaenid or blue butterfly found in Asia, especially in the lowland regions to mid-hills of India and Sri Lanka.

Description

The wingspan of both males and females ranges from 22 to 30 mm. The male is quite plain on the upperside and is brown, except for two orange tornal spots. The underside is silvery gray with lightly marked lines and speckles. Each hindwing of this butterfly has two tails. The markings of female are similar as the male but the tone is lighter.

Behavior
It flies close to the ground and flight similar to much the common white fourring (Ypthima ceylonica). So it can be often mistaken for it.

Food plants
Its larval host plants are orchid species such as Arundina graminifolia, Spathoglottis plicata, Vanda tesssellata, etc.

See also
 List of butterflies of India (Lycaenidae)

References

Wijeyeratne, Silva de Gehan (2015), Butterflies & Dragonflies of Sri Lanka (Page 73) 

Hypolycaenini
Butterflies described in 1884
Butterflies of Asia
Taxa named by Frederic Moore